Trafalgar Street may refer to:

 Trafalgar Street, Brighton
 Trafalgar Street, Nelson, New Zealand

Music
 Trafalgar Street (album) by Revive